The Lauter is a tributary to the Glan.

External links

Rivers and lakes of Western Palatinate
Rivers of Rhineland-Palatinate
Rivers of Germany